"Skin of My Teeth" (stylized in all uppercase) is a song by American singer Demi Lovato. It was released on June 10, 2022, by Island Records, as the lead single from Lovato's eighth studio album Holy Fvck (2022). The singer co-wrote the song with Oak Felder, Alex Niceforo, Keith Sorrells, Laura Veltz and Lil Aaron. Felder, Niceforo and Sorrells were the producers. "Skin of My Teeth" is a rock and pop punk song, with lyrics about people's criticisms or opinions about addictions and rehab.

Background 
In early 2022, Lovato announced on her social media the "funeral" of her pop music. During the first months of the year, the singer shared previews of what her new music would be, including "Skin of My Teeth". In May, after various rumors, Lovato stated that the album's lead single would be called "Skin of My Teeth". Days later, the cover and release date, June 10, were revealed. That day was finally released for digital download and streaming. It marks her return to the genres of pop punk and rock, after having experimented with them on Lovato's first two studio albums, Don't Forget (2008) and Here We Go Again (2009). The song references Lovato's struggles with substance abuse, with references to "rehab" and wanting to be free but failing due to the "disease" Lovato is enduring.

Lovato in the song's annotations on Genius says of the opening line that references yet another rehab visit, "it was a headline that I saw multiple times and I just felt like it was no one’s business!" Lovato then goes on to say that she does "not need anyone to keep track of my own journey" and that people should have "compassion for the struggle that I have along with many other people". Lovato has an emotive lyric in the song that says "I'm your son and I'm your daughter, I'm your mother, I'm your father" which is meant to "humanize" addiction as a struggle that many individuals face.

Music video 
The official music video for "Skin of My Teeth" premiered on June 10, 2022. It was directed by Nick Harwood and Nick Vernet, and produced by Shayna Giannelli. The music video begins with Lovato singing from a bathtub as an ominous figure reads headlines about Lovato's recent visit to rehab and stalks her with a camera. Eventually the pair come face to face in a dramatic confrontation that Lovato wins, while she ends the song with a rain sequence that features her electric guitar shooting out sparks.

Promotion 
Lovato performed the song on The Tonight Show Starring Jimmy Fallon hours before release, wearing all black, accompanied by a matching guitar, and surrounded by fog.

Critical reception 
NPR described "Skin of My Teeth" as a fun listening experience and compared the song to the pop rock sound of "Celebrity Skin" by Hole with the vocal affectations of "Born This Way" by  Lady Gaga. They also praised Lovato as having a "level of camp" in her art with genuineness and commitment to her music, unlike "other pop-punk revivalists". Loudwire praised the track for tackling addiction, and described it as having "an immediate sense of urgency, opening with two snare hits and some chord strumming" after which Lovato begins to sing in a sardonic vocal tone. The guitar tones in the song have "weight to them" with a "bouncing energy" that is reminiscent of "artists such as Pat Benatar and Joan Jett." The magazine also ranked the single as the 68th best rock song of the year.

Credits and personnel

Song credits 
Credits obtained from Lovato's official website.
 Demi Lovato – vocals, songwriting
 Oak Felder – production, songwriting, recording, programming, background vocals, keyboards, engineering
 Keith "Ten4" Sorrells – songwriting, programming, co-production, background vocals, guitar, bass, drums
 Laura Veltz – songwriting, background vocals
 Lil Aaron – songwriting, background vocals
 Alex Niceforo – songwriting, co-production, background vocals, guitar
 Oscar Linnander – recording, production assistance
 Manny Marroquin – mixing
 Zach Pereyra – mixing assistance
 Anthony Vilchis – mixing assistance
 Trey Station – mixing assistance
 Chris Gehringer – mastering

Music video 
Credits adapted from YouTube.
Justin Benoliel – EP
Shayna Gianelli – producer, for Object & Animal Production
 Nick Harwood – director
 Nick Vernet – creative director

Charts

Release history

Notes

References

External links 
 

2022 singles
2022 songs
Demi Lovato songs
Island Records singles
Songs written by Demi Lovato
Songs written by Oak Felder
Songs written by Laura Veltz
American pop punk songs
Songs written by Keith Sorrells